William Leslie Rowe (29 October 1890 – 8 March 1965) was a former Australian rules footballer who played with Carlton in the Victorian Football League (VFL).

Notes

External links 
		
Les Rowe's profile at Blueseum

1890 births
Australian rules footballers from Victoria (Australia)
Carlton Football Club players
1965 deaths